Suối Tiên Amusement Park is an amusement park in District 9, Thu Duc City, Hồ Chí Minh City, Vietnam. The park includes several entertainment areas. The landscaping and attractions in the park illustrate Vietnam's history and legends, such as Âu Cơ and Lạc Long Quân as well as the Battle of Son Tinh and Thuy Tinh (The Mountain God and The River God). An artificial seawater pool is located in the park for sea-bathers. There is also a dinosaur garden and a roller coaster called "Roller Coaster".

The Tiên Dong beach is a man-made beach featuring a large waterfall with the face of an emperor sculpted into it. The park is colorful, and you will find giant sculpted dragons painted in blue and orange pastels, soft red Buddha statues and lush green gardens, as well as all the normal theme park attractions; the park also has a zoo.

The park opened in 1995. The park will be served by Suoi Tien Park Station on the first line of the Ho Chi Minh City Metro, currently under construction.

References

External links

Tourist attractions in Ho Chi Minh City
Amusement parks in Vietnam
Buildings and structures in Ho Chi Minh City
1995 establishments in Vietnam